Waylon Sings Ol' Harlan is a 1967 album by American country music artist Waylon Jennings, released on RCA Victor. It consists completely of songs by Harlan Howard.

Background
Jennings had a great affection for Howard's songs, and most of his 1960s albums contain at least one song by Howard. This LP features some of Howard's most popular compositions, such as the standard "Heartaches By the Number," "Busted," (which had also been covered by Johnny Cash and Ray Charles), and two songs co-written with Buck Owens, "I've Got a Tiger By the Tail" and "Foolin' Around."  It was not as successful as Jennings' previous releases, peaking at #32 on the Billboard country albums chart.

Recording

In his autobiography, Jennings cited the LP as the first proper album he recorded after he was living in Nashville, recording it in two sessions spaced a week apart on May 24 and June 1, 1966 with his backing group the Waylors.  The singer later recalled:

We rehearsed the album the night before each recording session, setting the band up in Harland's office with a small two-track tape recorder.  Don Davis helped on the arrangements.  Some had been big hits and some hadn't.  One of my favourites was 'Beautiful Annabel Lee,' which Harlan wrote after the Edgar Allan Poe poem.  I'm not sure we ever beat the office version of 'She Called Me Baby,' despite all the leakage and phones ringing and general mayhem.

By his own estimation, Jennings covered over seventy of Howard's tunes, and later said, "Harlan was everybody's friend...I was writing more and more, and Harlan talked to me continually about the craft, giving me advice."

Track listing
All songs by Harlan Howard, except where noted.

"She Called Me Baby" – 2:34
"Sunset and Vine" – 2:08
"Woman Let Me Sing You a Song" – 2:18
"Everglades" – 2:10
"She's Gone, Gone, Gone" – 2:01
"Busted" – 2:19
"Beautiful Annabel Lee" – 2:43
"Heartaches by the Number" – 2:08
"I've Got a Tiger By the Tail" (Howard, Buck Owens) – 2:26
"Heartaches for a Dime" – 2:15
"Foolin' Around" (Howard, Buck Owens) – 2:19
"In This Very Same Room" – 2:41

References

Bibliography

External links
Waylon Jennings' Official Website

Sings Ol' Harlan
1967 albums
RCA Records albums
Albums produced by Chet Atkins